Robert Dillon, 1st Baron Clonbrock PC (27 February 1754 – 22 July 1795), was an Irish politician.

Dillon was the son of Luke Dillon and Bridget Kelly, daughter of John Kelly. His grandfather Robert Dillon had represented Dungarvan in the Irish House of Commons. Dillon was himself returned to the Irish Parliament for Lanesborough in 1776, a seat he held until 1790, when he was raised to the Peerage of Ireland as Baron Clonbrock, of Clonbrock in the County of Galway. He was appointed an Irish Privy Counsellor in 1795, but died before he could be sworn in.

Lord Clonbrock married Letitia Greene, daughter of John Greene, of Old Abbey, County Limerick, in 1776. He died at Clonbrock, County Galway, in July 1795, aged 41, and was succeeded in the barony by his son, Luke. Lady Clonbrock married as her second husband Clement Archer, State Surgeon in Ireland, in 1802 and died in September 1806.

References

1754 births
1795 deaths
Barons in the Peerage of Ireland
Members of the Privy Council of Ireland
Place of birth missing
Peers of Ireland created by George III